Ramakrishnan, better known by his stage name Ramki, is an Indian actor best known for his work in Tamil films. He made his debut in Chinna Poove Mella Pesu (1987). He was a lead actor from 1987 to 2004.

He was known for his performances in successful movies such as Senthoora Poove (1988), Maruthu Pandi (1990), Inaindha Kaigal (1990), Athma (1993), Karuppu Roja (1996) and RX 100 (2018).

He made his comeback in cinema after nine years and returned in a supporting role with the supernatural thriller film Masani (2013).

Career 
He started as an actor in 1987 with the film, Chinna Poove Mella Pesu. He appeared alongside Prabhu. The film was a commercial success. Ramki appeared in eight films during the year 1988, including Senthoora Poove where he co-starred with Vijayakanth and his future wife Nirosha. The film ran for over 200 days in theatres and was one of the highest-grossing Tamil films. Poovizhi Raja and Paravaigal Palavitham have received positive reviews. In 1989, He worked in movies such as Oru Thottil Sabadham, Ellame En Thangachi, Penn Buthi Mun Buthi, Yogam Rajayogam and En Kanavar.

After the success of Maruthu Pandi (1990), in the same year, he acted in the action-adventure, Inaindha Kaigal directed by N. K. Viswanathan and featured him in the second leading role alongside Arun Pandian and lead actress Nirosha. The film was released to positive reviews and became a Blockbuster. In 1991, he played in Vetri Padigal directed by Manobala while R. Sarathkumar acted in negative role. He starred in the horror films genre that are successful as Athma (1993), Thanga Pappa (1993), Mayabazar (1995) and Karuppu Roja (1996). In 1997, Ramki has acted in the movies such Thaali Pudhusu, Kalyana Vaibhogam, Samrat, Thadayam and  Pudhalvan. The movie Putham Puthu Poove was not released. On the other hand, the songs were successful specially for "Sevvanthi Poovukkum". In 1990's, he was known for his onscreen chemistry with Nirosha, Khushbu and Urvashi. In 1999, he acted in second role in Nilave Mugam Kaattu starring with Karthik and Devayani. He appears in a few sequences in the movies such as Poovellam Kettuppar (1999) and Kadhal Rojavae (2000).

During the 2000s, Ramki acted in second roles in devotional films such as Palayathu Amman (2000), Sri Raja Rajeshwari (2001) and Padai Veetu Amman (2002). His 1991 film, he acted in a movie Kuttrapathirikai of R. K. Selvamani's. After 15 long years, this movie finally got released in 2007; deleting some scenes.

In 2013, he made his come back with films such as Maasani and Biriyani. In 2016, he acted in Vaaimai and Atti. In 2017, he acted in Telugu movie, Aakatayi, where he played a pivotal role, followed by Tamil horror comedy film, Aangila Padam in the lead role. He acted in a Telugu film, RX 100 (2018) with which he wins Best Character Actor. He also appeared in the Sundar C.'s Action (2019) starring Vishal.

Personal life
Ramki is married to actress Nirosha in 1995.

Filmography

References

External links 

Indian male film actors
Living people
Male actors in Tamil cinema
People from Virudhunagar district
Male actors from Tamil Nadu
20th-century Indian male actors
21st-century Indian male actors
Male actors in Telugu cinema
1962 births
Santosham Film Awards winners